Cardiff Start is a community interest organisation based in Cardiff, Wales which aims to promote and develop the start up sector in Wales' capital city.

The group aims to empower entrepreneurs running startups in and around Cardiff, or those that work at them. It is Wales’s largest startup community.

History 

Cardiff Start was launched in April 2013 by Neil Cocker, a Cardiff and Sofia, Bulgaria-based businessman who has started a number of tech businesses in the city, and Stephen Millburn, an app developer behind TradeBox Media.

The organisation was founded as a community interest company.

The early startup sector 
The Cardiff startup scene has been aided by early interventions by the Cardiff Bay-based devolved Government, particularly through the Development Bank of Wales.

The early efforts were however still not deemed to be sufficient by the founders of Cardiff Start to compete with the burgeoning tech scene at East London Tech City or with other regional centres for technology such as Edinburgh.

Higher education prospects 
Cocker has described the city as particularly lucrative as a centre for start up businesses and technology companies, with Cardiff University, Cardiff Metropolitan University, and University of South Wales all providing talented young computer-literate graduates who can fill demand for programmers and developers. The city lacked a particular conduit for networking and business advice, however, which is a focus for Cardiff Start's efforts.

Sector developments 
In 2017, the BBC covered the sector and the development of Cardiff Start, aided by interviews from Milburn and Cocker. In the report, Cardiff Start described how nearly 80 tech start-up companies had received £60m from Development Bank of Wales in the past 10 years, but that its network of 2,500 members found that Government backed support was "often not fit for purpose".

In 2019 Cardiff Start hosted, along with marketing firm Yard Digital, a "Startup Residency", attracting applications from a range of entrepreneurs in the city.

The organisation frequently engages with media companies and journalists to promote the city's potential. In 2019 the group were cited by Small Business magazine in its Essential Guide to Starting a Business in Cardiff.

The group engages with the range of stakeholders in the region, which include the Alacrity Foundation, Innovation Point, the National Cyber Security Academy, and the Cardiff Metropolitan School of Technologies.

See also 

 Startup company
 Start-up Nation
 Business incubator
 Welsh Government
 Development Bank of Wales
 Cardiff University
 Cardiff Metropolitan University
 University of South Wales
 Central Square, Cardiff
 Economy of Cardiff

Further reading

External links 

 Cardiff Start - Facebook Group

References 

Organisations based in Cardiff
Community interest companies
Organisations based in Wales
Business organisations based in the United Kingdom